The 1934 Belgian Grand Prix (formally the V Grand Prix de Belgique) was a Grand Prix motor race, which was run on 29 July 1934 in Spa-Francorchamps, Belgium. The race lasted 596.05 km (14.90 km x 40 laps). It was the fifth running of the Belgian Grand Prix.

Classification 

Fastest Lap:  Antonio Brivio (Bugatti T59), 5:45.0

Note: Mercedes and Auto Union teams withdrew when Belgian customs asked
the teams to pay BF180,000 duty on their alcohol based fuel.

 For much more details inclunding Starting Grid

References 

Belgian Grand Prix
Belgian Grand Prix
Grand Prix